Semiramis (Šammīrām,  Samīrāmīs,  Šamiram) was the semi-legendary Lydian-Babylonian wife of Onnes and Ninus, who succeeded the latter to the throne of Assyria, according to Movses Khorenatsi. Legends narrated by Diodorus Siculus, who drew primarily from the works of Ctesias of Cnidus, describe her and her relationships to Onnes and King Ninus.

Armenians and the Assyrians of Iraq, northeast Syria, southeast Turkey, and northwest Iran still use Shamiram as a given name for girls.

The real and historical Shammuramat (the original Akkadian form of the name) was the Assyrian wife of Shamshi-Adad V (ruled 824 BC–811 BC). She was the ruler of the Neo-Assyrian Empire as its regent for five years before her son Adad-nirari III came of age and took the reins of power. She ruled at a time of political uncertainty, which is one of the possible explanations for why Assyrians may have accepted the rule of a woman when it was not allowed by the cultural tradition. She conquered much of the Middle East and the Levant and stabilized and strengthened the empire after a destructive civil war. It has been speculated that being a woman who ruled successfully may have made the Assyrians regard her with particular reverence and that her achievements may have been retold over the generations until she was turned into that legendary figure.

The name of Semiramis came to be applied to various monuments in Western Asia and Anatolia whose origins had been forgotten or unknown. Various places in Upper Mesopotamia and throughout Mesopotamia as a whole, Media, Persia, the Levant, Anatolia, the Arabian Peninsula, and the Caucasus bore the name of Semiramis, or as slightly changed. It appears during the Middle Ages and Shamiramagerd (meaning created by Semiramis in Armenian) is the old name of the Armenian city of Van. Ultimately, nearly every stupendous work of antiquity near the Euphrates or in Iran seems to have been ascribed to her, even the Behistun Inscription of Darius. Herodotus ascribes to her the artificial banks that confined the Euphrates and he knew her name because it was inscribed on a gate of Babylon.

Historical figure 

While the achievements of Semiramis are clearly in the realm of mythical Persian, Armenian, and Greek historiography, the historical Shammuramat certainly existed. After her husband's death, she might have served as regent for her son, Adad-nirari III. Thus, during that time Shammuramat could have been in control of the vast Neo-Assyrian Empire (911-605 BC), which stretched from the Caucasus Mountains in the north to the Arabian Peninsula in the south, and from western Iran in the east to Cyprus in the west. In the city of Aššur on the Tigris, she had an obelisk built and inscribed that read, "Stele of Shammuramat, queen of Shamshi-Adad, King of the Universe, King of Assyria, Mother of Adad Nirari, King of the Universe, King of Assyria, Daughter-in-Law of Shalmaneser, King of the Four Regions of the World."

Legend according to Diodorus Siculus 

According to Diodorus, a first century BC Greek historian, Semiramis was of noble parents, the daughter of the fish-goddess Derketo of Ascalon in Assyria and of a mortal. He related that Derketo abandoned her at birth and drowned herself and that doves fed the child until Simmas, the royal shepherd, found her. Semiramis married Onnes or Menones, a general under King Ninus, and she became an advisor to king. Her advice led him to great successes and, at the Siege of Bactra, she personally led a party of soldiers to seize a key defensive point, leading to the capture of the city. Ninus was so struck that he fell in love with her and tried to compel Onnes to give her to him as a wife, first offering his own daughter Sonanê in return and eventually threatening to put out his eyes as punishment. Out of fear of the king, and out of doomed passion for his wife, Onnes "fell into a kind of frenzy and madness" and hanged himself. Ninus then married Semiramis.

Diodorus related that after their marriage, Semiramis and Ninus had a son named Ninyas. After King Ninus conquered Asia, including the Bactrians, he was fatally wounded by an arrow and Semiramis disguised herself as her son so the army would follow her instructions, thinking they came from their new ruler. He wrote that her reign lasted for 42 years and that she conquered much of Asia and achieved many feats: she restored ancient Babylon and protected it with a high brick wall that completely surrounded the city; she built several palaces in Persia, including Ecbatana; she not only ruled Asia effectively but also added Libya and Aethiopia to the empire; and she then went to war with King Stabrobates (Satyavrata) of India, having her artisans build an army of false elephants by putting manipulated skins of dark-skinned buffaloes over her camels to deceive the Indians into thinking she had acquired real elephants. This ploy succeeded initially, but then she was wounded in the counterattack and her army mainly annihilated, forcing the surviving remnants to re-ford the Indus and retreat to the west.

Diodorus mistakenly attributed the Behistun Inscription to her, now known to have been produced by Darius the Great. The writings of Diodorus about Semiramis is strongly influenced by the writings of Ctesias of Cnidus, but recent research suggests that his writings about Semiramis do not always follow those by Ctesias.

Other ancient traditions 

Legends describing Semiramis have been recorded by approximately 80 ancient writers including Plutarch, Eusebius, Polyaenus, Valerius Maximus, Orosius, and Justinus. She was associated with Ishtar and Astarte since the time before Diodorus. The association of the fish and dove is found at Hierapolis Bambyce (Mabbog, now Manbij), the great temple that according to one legend, was founded by Semiramis, where her statue was shown with a golden dove on her head.

The name of Semiramis came to be applied to various monuments in Western Asia and Anatolia, the origins of which ancient writers sometimes asserted had been forgotten or unknown. Various places in Assyria and throughout Mesopotamia as a whole, Media, Persia, the Levant, Anatolia, the Arabian Peninsula, and the Caucasus bore the name of Semiramis in slightly changed forms, even some named during the Middle Ages. She is credited with founding the city of Van in Turkey in order to have a summer residence and that city may be found referred to as Shamiramagerd (city of Semiramis). 

Herodotus, an ancient Greek writer, geographer, and historian living from  484 to 425 BC, ascribes to Semiramis the artificial banks that confined the Euphrates and knows her name as borne by a gate of Babylon. Strabo, a Greek geographer, philosopher, and historian who lived in Asia Minor during 64 or 63 BC to 24 AD, credits her with building earthworks and other structures "throughout almost the whole continent". Nearly every stupendous work of antiquity by the Euphrates or in Iran seems to have ultimately been ascribed to Semiramis, even the Behistun Inscription of Darius.

Roman historian Ammianus Marcellinus (born c. 330, died c. 391 – 400), who wrote the penultimate major historical account surviving from antiquity, credits her as the first person to castrate a male youth into eunuch-hood: "Semiramis, that ancient queen who was the first person to castrate male youths of tender age".

Armenian tradition portrays Semiramis negatively, possibly because of a victorious military campaign she waged against them. One of the most popular legends in Armenian tradition involves Semiramis and an Armenian king, Ara the Handsome. According to that legend, Semiramis had fallen in love with the handsome Armenian King Ara and asked him to marry her. When he refused, in her passion she gathered the armies of Assyria and marched against Armenia. During the battle Semiramis was victorious, but Ara was slain despite her orders to capture him alive. This legend continues that to avoid continuous warfare with the Armenians, Semiramis, who they alleged was a sorceress, took his body and prayed to deities to raise Ara from the dead. When the Armenians advanced to avenge their leader, she disguised one of her lovers as Ara and spread the rumor that the deities had brought Ara back to life, reportedly, convincing the Armenians not to continue the war.

In one persistent tradition in this vein, the prayers of Semiramis are successful and Ara returns to life. During the nineteenth century, it was reported that a village called Lezk, near Van in Turkey, traditionally held that it was the location of the resurrection of Ara.

In later traditions

Although negative portrayals did exist, generally, Semiramis was viewed positively before the rise of Christianity. During the Middle Ages, she became associated with promiscuity and lustfulness. One story claimed that she had an incestuous relationship with her son, justifying it by passing a law to legitimize parent-child marriages, and inventing the chastity belt to deter any romantic rivals before he eventually killed her. This was likely popularized in the fifth century by Orosius in his universal history, Seven Books of History Against the Pagans, which has been described as an "anti-pagan polemic". In the Divine Comedy, Dante places Semiramis among the souls of the lustful in the Second Circle of Hell. She appears in Petrarch's Triumph of Love, canto III, verse 76. She is one of three women exemplifying "evil love" (the other two being Byblis and Myrrha). She is included in De Mulieribus Claris, a collection of biographies of historical and mythological women by the Florentine author Giovanni Boccaccio that was composed in 13611362. It is notable as the first collection devoted exclusively to biographies of women in Western literature. However, Semiramis always was admired for her martial and political achievements.

Her reputation partly recovered in the late Middle Ages and Renaissance. She was included in Christine de Pizan's The Book of the City of Ladies (finished by 1405) and, starting in the fourteenth century, she was commonly found on the  Nine Worthies list for women.

Literary references 

Semiramis appears in many plays, such as Voltaire's tragedy Sémiramis and Pedro Calderón de la Barca's drama La hija del aire, and in multiple separate operas by dozens of composers such as Antonio Vivaldi, Christoph Willibald Gluck  Domenico Cimarosa, Josef Mysliveček, Giacomo Meyerbeer, and Gioachino Rossini. Arthur Honegger composed music for Paul Valéry's eponymous 'ballet-pantomime' in 1934 that was revived in 1992 after many years of neglect. In Eugène Ionesco's play The Chairs, the Old Woman character is referred to as Semiramis.

She was mentioned by William Shakespeare in Act 2 Scene 1 of Titus Andronicus and Scene 2 of the Induction in The Taming of the Shrew. Portrayal of Semiramis has been used as a metaphor for female rulership. Sometimes she is referenced during political disputes regarding rule by women, both as an unfavorable comparison (for example, against Elizabeth I of England) and as an example of a woman who governed well. Powerful female monarchs Margaret I of Denmark and Catherine the Great were given the designation Semiramis of the North.

In the twentieth century, Semiramis has appeared in several sword and sandal films, including the 1954 film Queen of Babylon in which she was played by Rhonda Fleming, and the 1963 film I am Semiramis in which she was played by Yvonne Furneaux. In John Myers Myers's novel Silverlock, Semiramis appears as a lustful, commanding queen, who stops her procession to try to seduce young Lucius (who has been transformed into a donkey).

The Two Babylons 

Despite a lack of supporting evidence in the Bible, the book The Two Babylons (1853), by the Christian minister Alexander Hislop, was particularly influential in characterizing her as the Whore of Babylon. Hislop claimed that Semiramis invented polytheism and, with it, goddess worship. He also claimed that the head of the Catholic Church inherited and continued to propagate a millennia-old secret conspiracy founded by Semiramis and the Biblical king Nimrod to propagate the pagan religion of ancient Babylon. Grabbe and others have rejected the allegations in this book as based on a flawed understanding of the texts, but variations of them are accepted among some groups of evangelical Protestants.

Hislop asserted that Semiramis was a queen consort and the mother of Nimrod, builder of the Bible's Tower of Babel. He said that Semiramis and Nimrod's incestuous male offspring was the Akkadian deity Tammuz, and that all divine pairings in religions were retellings of this story. These claims are still circulated among some groups of evangelical Protestants, in the form of Jack Chick tracts, comic books, and related media.

Critics have dismissed the speculations by Hislop as based on misunderstandings.

Lester L. Grabbe has claimed Hislop's argument, particularly his association of Ninus with Nimrod, is based on a misunderstanding of historical Babylon and its religion. Grabbe criticized Hislop for portraying Semiramis as Nimrod's consort, despite that she has not been found in a single text associated with him, and for portraying her as the "mother of harlots", even though this is not how she is depicted in any of the historical texts where she is mentioned.

Ralph Woodrow also has been critical of this interpretation and has stated that Alexander Hislop "picked, chose and mixed" portions of various myths from different cultures.

In modern culture 

 The Semiramis InterContinental Hotel in Cairo is named after her. It is where the Cairo Conference of 1921 took place and was presided over by Winston Churchill.
 Semiramis appears in the Japanese light novel and anime series Fate/Apocrypha of the Fate franchise as the Assassin of Red. She also appears in the mobile game of the same franchise, Fate/Grand Order.
 Semiramis is an Italian progressive rock band who produced one LP in 1973, Dedicato a Frazz.

See also 
Euphrates Tunnel

References

Bibliography

Primary sources 

Paulinus Minorita, Compendium
Eusebius, Chronicon 20.13-17, 19-26 ( Schoene pp.53-63 )
Orosius, Historiae adversus paganos i.4, ii.2.5, 6.7
Justinus, Epitome Historiarum philippicarum Pompei Trogi i.2
Valerius Maximus, Factorum et dictorum memorabilium libri ix.3, ext 4

Secondary sources 

Beringer, A. 2016. The Sight of Semiramis: Medieval and Early Modern Narratives of the Babylonian Queen. Tempe: Arizona State University Press.
Dross-Krüpe, K. 2020. Semiramis, de qua innumerabilia narrantur. Rezeption und Verargumentierung der Königin von Babylon von der Antike bis in die opera seria des Barock Wiesbaden: Harrassowitz.

 
9th-century BC women rulers
Ancient Assyrians
Women in ancient Near Eastern warfare
Hellenistic historiography
Middle Eastern goddesses
Ancient Mesopotamia in popular culture
Mythological queens
Ancient queens regnant
Ancient Mesopotamian women
Nimrod
9th-century BC monarchs